José del transito Vergara Agulera (August 15, 1915 – ) was a Chilean boxer who competed in the 1936 Summer Olympics.

In 1936 he was eliminated in the second round of the bantamweight class after losing his fight to Joseph Cornelis.

External links
José Vergara's profile at Sports Reference.com

1915 births
Year of death missing
Bantamweight boxers
Olympic boxers of Chile
Boxers at the 1936 Summer Olympics
Chilean male boxers
20th-century Chilean people